Ján Húska (born 5 June 1949) is a Slovak biathlete. He competed in the relay event at the 1972 Winter Olympics.

References

1949 births
Living people
Slovak male biathletes
Olympic biathletes of Czechoslovakia
Biathletes at the 1972 Winter Olympics
People from Liptovský Mikuláš District
Sportspeople from the Žilina Region